Charles J. Smith  (December 11, 1840 – November 15, 1897) was a Major League Baseball infielder. He played in 14 games for the New York Mutuals in 1871, hitting .264 in 72 at bats.

In the pre-professional era of early baseball, Smith played for the amateur Brooklyn Enterprise until 1858, when he joined the Brooklyn Atlantics, for whom he played until 1870.

Sources
 Baseball Reference

Major League Baseball infielders
Brooklyn Atlantics (NABBP) players
New York Mutuals players
Sportspeople from Brooklyn
Baseball players from New York City
19th-century baseball players
1840 births
1897 deaths
Burials at Green-Wood Cemetery